Elissa Altman is an American food writer and author. She has written three memoirs: Poor Man’s Feast: A Love Story of Comfort, Desire, and the Art of Simple Cooking, Treyf: My Life as an Unorthodox Outlaw, and Motherland: A Memoir of Love, Loathing, and Longing. Her blog "Poor Man's Feast" won a James Beard Foundation Award for Individual Food Blog in 2012.

Early life and education
Altman was born in New York to Rita, a former television singer and Cy Altman, an advertising agency creative director. She was raised in Forest Hills, Queens. On Saturday family visits to Manhattan, she and her father would have lunch at French restaurants or Jewish delis. On Sundays, she and her family would visit her immigrant grandparents in Brooklyn.

She graduated with BA in English literature from Boston University in 1985. She also attended Gonville & Caius College, Cambridge University in 1983.

After graduating from Boston University, Altman attended the Institute of Culinary Education, and then began writing for the Hartford Courant as a restaurant critic and freelance columnist. In 2000 after she moved to rural Connecticut to live with her partner Susan.

Career
Altman began a career in publishing as an editorial assistant at Ballantine Books in 1985, two weeks after her graduation from Boston University. She worked for Dean & Deluca in Manhattan from 1987 to 1990, as a book department manager. Altman left bookselling and worked as an editor at HarperCollins Publishers from 1992 until 2000, specializing in memoir. In 2010, Altman began writing essays for The Huffington Post and in 2008, Altman launched a narrative food blog, Poor Man's Feast, and it won a James Beard Foundation Award for Individual Food Blog in 2012. She is a contributor to publications ranging from Orion Magazine and Wall Street Journal to LitHub, Lion's Roar, On Being, O:The Oprah Magazine, and The Washington Post, where her column, Feeding My Mother, ran for a year from 2015-2016. She has reviewed books for Avenue Magazine, The Boston Globe, and O: The Oprah Magazine, and is a member of the memoir faculty at Fine Arts Work Center and Maine Writers and Publishers Alliance.

Poor Man's Feast: A Love Story of Comfort, Desire, and the Art of Simple Cooking

Her first memoir Poor Man's Feast: A Love Story of Comfort, Desire, and the Art of Simple Cooking was published in 2013. The book is based on her blog, and described by Dawn Drzal in The New York Times as a "smart yet tender tale of her gastronomical and spiritual evolution" from New York City to rural Connecticut with her partner Susan Turner.

Treyf: My Life as an Unorthodox Outlaw
Treyf: My Life as an Unorthodox Outlaw was published in 2016 and is a prequel memoir of her Jewish household in 1960s and 1970s Queens, and her experience coming out as a lesbian and marrying a Catholic woman. According to Kirkus Reviews, "Altman not only reveals how she learned to interweave the contradictory threads of her life into a complex whole. She also gives eloquent voice to the universal human desire to belong." In a review for Lambda Literary, Gena Hymowech writes, "I appreciate it when an author can take a random thing, like food, and recognize the way it symbolizes something else, something even more important. And that is exactly what Elissa Altman does in Treyf – food stands in for love, faith, and rebelliousness."

Julie Wittes Schlack writes for WBUR, "The author, her conflicted father, her glamorous, self-starving mother, her friends who chant from the Torah on their bat mitzvahs, then celebrate with shrimp-in-lobster sauce at their post-shul luncheons at the Tung Shing House – they are all modern Americans alternately fleeing and embracing identities rooted in the ancient." According to Publishers Weekly, "Her decades-long struggle to regain the happiness and comfort she felt in her beloved maternal grandmother’s home is depicted lovingly, with many moments of heartbreak and disappointment but also joy and contentment."

Motherland: A Memoir of Love, Loathing, and Longing
Motherland: A Memoir of Love, Loathing, and Longing was published in 2019 and is a memoir that centers on her relationship with her mother. Kirkus Reviews writes, "Funny, raw, and tender, Altman’s book examines the inevitable role reversals that occur in parent-child relationships while laying bare a mother-daughter relationship that is both entertaining and excruciating." According to Publishers Weekly, "Throughout her life Altman struggles to balance devotion to her mother with a need to maintain boundaries for her own self-preservation, all of which comes to a moment of clarity when Altman decides to have children."

Honors and awards
 2012 James Beard Foundation Award for Individual Food Blog
 2013 Boston University College of General Studies Distinguished Alumni Award
 Finalist, 2020 Lambda Literary Award for Lesbian Memoir or Biography at 32nd Lambda Literary Awards (Motherland) 
 Finalist, 2020 Connecticut Center for the Book Connecticut Book Award (Motherland)
 Finalist, 2020 Maine Literary Award (Motherland)

References

External links

 Elissa Altman's book details her love of food and finding the love of her life (Iowa Public Radio interview, Oct. 22, 2021)

Living people
21st-century American Jews
Boston University alumni
American autobiographers
21st-century American women writers
21st-century American memoirists
Year of birth missing (living people)
American lesbian writers